The Zarbuz Formation (Russian: Zarbuz Svita), also named Zarbiz Svita, is a Jurassic (Callovian to Oxfordian) geologic formation in Tajikistan. Fossil ornithopod tracks have been reported from the formation.

Fossil content 
The following fossils have been reported from the formation:
 Ichnofossils
 Dinosauria indet.

See also 
 List of dinosaur-bearing rock formations
 List of stratigraphic units with ornithischian tracks
 Ornithopod tracks

References

Bibliography 

  
 

Geologic formations of Tajikistan
Jurassic System of Asia
Jurassic Tajikistan
Callovian Stage
Oxfordian Stage
Ichnofossiliferous formations
Paleontology in Tajikistan